Shilpa Thakre (born 22 October 1992) is an Indian dancer and actress known for her work in Marathi Cinema. She rose to fame due to her short videos on social media.

Early life 

Thakre completed Engineering in Electronics and Telecommunication in Nagpur. She worked night shift at Tech Mahindra in Pune for 2 years, while doing auditions for film roles in the mornings.

Career 

Thakre became known after her short videos, posted to social media, went viral. She is known as expression queen due to her videos on Youtube, Tiktok and Likee. As a result, she started receiving offers for film roles and has appeared in a number, including Khichik, Triple Seat, Ibhrat and Bhirkit.

Filmography

Films

Television

References

External links
 
 

Thakre,Shilpa
Actresses in Marathi cinema
Living people
Marathi actors
Actresses in Marathi theatre
Actresses in Marathi television
Indian television actresses
Indian film actresses
20th-century Indian actresses
21st-century Indian actresses
Indian stage actresses
1992 births